Cyana heidrunae is a moth of the family Erebidae first described by Henri Hoppe in 2004. It is found on Bioko, an island off the west coast of Africa.

References

Cyana
Moths described in 2004
Moths of Africa
Fauna of Bioko